The welterweight class in the boxing at the 1964 Summer Olympics competition was the fifth-heaviest class.  Welterweights were limited to those boxers weighing less than 67 kilograms. 30 boxers from 30 nations competed.

Medalists

Results

References

Sources

W